In molecular biology, the UBX protein domain is found in ubiquitin-regulatory proteins, which are members of the ubiquitination pathway, as well as a number of other ubiquitin-like proteins including FAF-1 (FAS-associated factor 1), the human Rep-8 reproduction protein and several hypothetical proteins from yeast. The function of the UBX domain is not known although the fragment of avian FAF-1 containing the UBX domain causes apoptosis of transfected cells.

Function 
So far, as yet, no general function for the UBX domain has yet emerged. Additionally, the absence of a carboxy-terminal di-glycine motif, however, indicates that UBX domains are not covalently
attached to target proteins in a ubiquitin-like manner.

Structure 
The UBX domain comprises about 80 amino acid residues. They are distinct structural units
defining a large family of proteins that often exhibit a modular domain architecture
three-dimensional structures of UBX domains reveal a close structural relationship with ubiquitin despite the lack of significant sequence homology

Homology
UBX domain is very similar to ubiquitin which gives us some indication of evolution. There are ubiquitin fusion which seem to be advantageous for ribosomal subunit folding.

References 

Protein domains